A cargo bike (also known as a box bike, carrier cycle, freight bicycle, cycletruck, or freight tricycle) is a human powered vehicle designed and constructed specifically for transporting loads. Cargo bike designs include a cargo area consisting of an open or enclosed box, a flat platform, or a wire basket, usually mounted over one or both wheels, low behind the front wheel, or between parallel wheels at either the front or rear of the vehicle. The frame, drivetrain and wheels must be constructed to handle loads larger than those on an ordinary bicycle.

Development 
The first cargo bikes were used by tradesmen to deliver mail, bread and milk amongst other things. Early cargo bikes were heavy-duty standard bicycles, with heavy carriers at front or rear, sometimes with a smaller front wheel to accommodate a large front carrier. During the early part of the 20th century these were commonly used by tradesmen for local deliveries. In the UK this style is still sometimes known as a butcher's bike or delibike, although the Post Office have by far the largest fleet.

With the domination of the internal combustion engine in the industrialized countries after World War II, cargo bikes became less popular. In the rest of the world, however, they continued to be manufactured and heavily used. In the 2000s, ecologically minded designers and small-scale manufacturers initiated a revival of the cargo bike manufacturing sector.

Common uses 
Cargo bikes are used in a variety of settings:
 Delivery services in dense urban environments
 Transporting children
 Food vending in high foot traffic areas (including specialist ice cream bikes)
 Transporting trade tools, including around large installations such as power stations and CERN
 Airport cargo handling
 Recycling collections
 Warehouse inventory transportation
 Mail delivery (The UK post office operates a fleet of 33,000 bicycles, mainly the Pashley MailStar)

Considerations 
Cargo bikes have a number of advantages over motorized vehicles:
 They do not create air pollution (e.g. enclosed warehouses and industrial plants)
 They produce fewer greenhouse gas emissions 
 They are less costly to operate
 They are quiet
 They are not limited by the availability of fuel
 They are less dangerous than other road vehicles and much less deadly for other road users
 They contribute less to traffic jams

Some cargo bike makers and users utilize power assist motors to complement the power of the cyclist. Power assist can increase the payload and range of cargo bikes, but also increases the cost of the bicycle and requires an on-board battery.

Types 

In Amsterdam and Copenhagen, cargo bikes are extremely popular. In Amsterdam many residents simply fit large front carriers to sturdy city bicycles. There is also a broad variety of specially made cargo bikes including low-loading two-wheelers with extended wheelbases, bicycles with small front wheels to fit huge front carriers, tadpole-type three-wheelers with a box between the two front wheels. Other varieties include a platform, basket etc. instead of the box, the loading area between two rear wheels (delta-fashion), small-wheel two-wheelers loading both back and front. An occasional four-wheeler can also be seen, especially within a plant, warehouse or the like, where demands on stability and loading capacity are higher than on range.

Many models are now available with an electric assist which can make them more useful for longer distances or for varied terrain, i.e. not flat cities, amongst other reasons, such as feeling more confident riding in car traffic due to faster acceleration from stopping.

Cycle truck 
The Cycle truck refers to a type of cargo bike with a smaller front wheel than rear, typically  rear and  front.

Butcher's bike 

Also referred to as a Baker's bike, although this style of cargo bike was popular with a wide variety of trades during the first half of the 20th century, particularly in the United Kingdom. Typically, they would have a basket or storage box mounted within a framework which was fixed to the frame (not the forks) of the bike. Often, they would also feature a sign advertising the business concerned, which would be attached within the main triangle of the bicycle frame.

The Schwinn Cycle Truck, produced in America between 1939 and 1967, also employed the same basket to frame arrangement.

Boda-boda 

A boda-boda (or bodaboda) is a two-wheeled bicycle or motorcycle taxi, originally in East Africa. Boda Boda is also the name of Yuba Bicycles compact cargo bike introduced in 2012.

Stroller Bike
A cargo bicycle that converts into a stroller. Three wheels are utilized when the bike is in a stroller configuration, and two wheels are utilized when it is in a bike configuration with the cargo in front of the cyclist. This cargo bike can carry up to 100 lbs (45.4 kg). The stroller bike won the Gold Award at the Eurobike exhibition in 2018 as a special-purpose bike.

Long John bicycle 

The Long John Bicycle is a cargo bike with the cargo area in front of the rider and some linkage connecting the steering to the front wheel, "linkage steering".

The term "bakfiets" (which means "box bike" in Dutch; plural is "bakfietsen") is also used to describe this style of bicycle.

Vintage Long Johns are becoming collectible. The last known manufacturer to still produce the original Long John is Monark. The history of Long John Bicycles is traced to Denmark . The Smith & Co. Company (SCO - founded by Ivar Smith and Robert Jacobsen in Odense, Denmark 17 October 1894) was the inventor and the first to build this type of cargo bicycle. The first Long-John was presented to the public at the Wembley World Fair & Exhibition in 1924.

This style of bicycle is useful for carrying cargo, including children, and can function as a car replacement for many families. It is possible to install a carseat in the box to for babies, and when children get older, they are often seated on a small bench and clipped in with a 3- or 5-point harness. Canopies can be affixed to the cargo box for protection from the elements, making a warm and inviting space for children to enjoy the ride.

Off-road Long John bicycle 

The range of Long John style cargobikes extends to off-road applications. Such designs can cover difficult terrain such as sand, mud, and snow, by using fatbike tires, electric motors, and suitable ground clearance. This brings cargobikes into farms, national parks, 1st-response situations, and immunization programs.

Longtail bicycle 

Longtails have a longer frame wheelbase at the rear compared to a standard bicycle. The extended rear facilitates use as a cargo bike or carrying multiple or adult passengers compared with shorter bicycles. They tend to handle more like regular bikes than cargo bikes with linkage steering.

Xtracycle developed the first longtail product, their Free Radical, which attaches to an existing 'donor' bicycle to make it a longtail bike in 1998. The growing popularity of Xtracycle inspired the Kona Ute, launched for the 2008 season. Surly were asked by Xtracycle to build a complete Xtracycle-compatible frameset; the result was the 'Big Dummy', first released for the 2008 season. The chromoly frameset is designed for  wheels. Buyers have the choice of frameset alone or complete bicycle. In 2008 Xtracycle documented the LongTail as an open-source standard. This has helped individuals to build longtail bikes themselves such as the Xtravois.

There is a sub-class of longtail bicycles referred to as midtails. As their name implies, they are not quite as long as a longtail, but can still often carry at least one if not two children. The distinction between both is not clear and there are longer tailed bikes sold as midtail, while shorter are categorized as longtail.

Wooden cargo bike 

The chukudu (or chikudu, cbokoudou) is a two-wheeled vehicle similar to a scooter used in the east of the Democratic Republic of Congo. It is made of wood, and used for transporting cargo.

Porteur bicycle 

A porteur bicycle has the rack on the front, and can carry as much as  that way.

Tricycle 

Cycle rickshaws are used for the short range transport of both people and goods while tricycles with boxes or platforms are used to transport goods. A cargo tricycle with an open or flat platform might be used for low value goods or for trips where the rider is always with the goods. A fabric cover can be added to provide weather protection. Tricycles can also be fitted with a lockable weatherproof box, usually of aluminium construction, for valuable goods and where the rider has to leave the vehicle.

The weight capacity of tricycles is limited by available human power and the permitted power of electric assist by law.

Gallery

See also 

 Bicycle trailer
 Electric bicycle
 Human-powered transport
 Outline of cycling
 Quadracycle (human-powered vehicle)
  electrically powered four-wheel carts used in the Netherlands

References

External links
 

Appropriate technology
Cycle types
Bike